The Statute Law Revision Act 1960 (8 & 9 Eliz 2 c 56) is an Act of the Parliament of the United Kingdom.

This Act was partly in force in Great Britain at the end of 2010.

Section 1 - Repeal of obsolete, spent or unnecessary enactments
Section 1(1) was repealed by section 1 of, and Part XI of the Schedule to, the Statute Law (Repeals) Act 1974.

Section 2 - Saving for powers of Parliament of Northern Ireland
This section was repealed by section 41(1) of, and Part I of Schedule 6 to, the Northern Ireland Constitution Act 1973.

Schedule
The Schedule was repealed by section 1 of, and Part XI of the Schedule to, the Statute Law (Repeals) Act 1974.

See also
Statute Law Revision Act

References
Halsbury's Statutes,
John Burke (General editor). Current Law Statutes Annotated 1960. Sweet & Maxwell, Stevens & Sons. London. W Green & Son. Edinburgh. 1960.
The Public General Acts and Church Assembly Measure 1960. HMSO. London. 1961. Page 647.
HL Deb vol 225, col 319, HC Deb vol 627, cols 1032 to 1034.

External links

United Kingdom Acts of Parliament 1960